The 2018–19 NCAA Division I men's ice hockey season began in October 2018 and ended with the Frozen Four in April 2019. This was the 72nd season in which an NCAA ice hockey championship was held, and United States college ice hockey's 125th year overall.

Polls

Regular season

Overtime rule changes
The NCAA Playing Rules Oversight Panel approved a proposal to allow conferences to use one of two alternative formats to award points in their league standings after the mandatory five-on-five, five-minute overtime period.

After a traditional five-minute, five-on-five overtime, conferences may use either a five-minute, three-on-three overtime period and a shootout or only a shootout to award additional conference points. Conferences are not required to use one of the alternative systems and may end play after the five-minute overtime.

During non-conference regular-season games, these alternative options are not permitted, and a game would end in a tie after the traditional five-minute overtime.

In regular-season tournaments that require advancement, a 20-minute sudden death format can be implemented for overtime, instead of the traditional five-minute overtime period. These tournaments also may use the three-on-three and shootout or the standalone shootout format.

Each conference's approach if no goal is scored in the initial five-minute overtime:
 Atlantic Hockey, ECAC & Hockey East: game ends in tie
 Big Ten, NCHC & WCHA: Five-minute, three-on-three overtime; if still tied a sudden-death shootout follows

Points Explanation:
 Atlantic Hockey, ECAC & Hockey East: Teams are awarded two points for each conference win in regulation or five-on-five overtime. Teams are awarded one point for a tie.
 Big Ten, NCHC & WCHA: Teams are awarded three points for each conference win in regulation or five-on-five overtime. A three-on-three overtime or shootout win is worth two points in the standings while the team that loses the three-on-three overtime/shootout receives just one point. The three-on-three overtime and shootouts only affect conference standings while the game is officially a tie for NCAA purposes.

Season tournaments

Standings

PairWise Rankings
The PairWise Rankings (PWR) are a statistical tool designed to approximate the process by which the NCAA selection committee decides which teams get at-large bids to the 16-team NCAA tournament. Although the NCAA selection committee does not use the PWR as presented by USCHO, the PWR has been accurate in predicting which teams will make the tournament field.
	
For Division I men, all teams are included in comparisons starting in the 2013–14 season (formerly, only teams with a Ratings Percentage Index of .500 or above, or teams under consideration, were included). The PWR method compares each team with every other such team, with the winner of each “comparison” earning one PWR point. After all comparisons are made, the points are totaled up and rankings listed accordingly.
	
With 60 Division I men's teams, the greatest number of PWR points any team could earn is 59, winning the comparison with every other team. Meanwhile, a team that lost all of its comparisons would have no PWR points.

Teams are then ranked by PWR point total, with ties broken by the teams’ RPI ratings, which starting in 2013–14 is weighted for home and road games and includes a quality wins bonus (QWB) for beating teams in the top 20 of the RPI (it also is weighted for home and road).
	
When it comes to comparing teams, the PWR uses three criteria which are combined to make a comparison: RPI, record against common opponents and head-to-head competition. Starting in 2013–14, the comparison of record against teams under consideration was dropped because all teams are now under comparison.

2019 NCAA tournament

Note: * denotes overtime period

Player stats

Scoring leaders

GP = Games played; G = Goals; A = Assists; Pts = Points; PIM = Penalty minutes

Leading goaltenders
The following goaltenders lead the NCAA in goals against average.

GP = Games played; Min = Minutes played; W = Wins; L = Losses; T = Ties; GA = Goals against; SO = Shutouts; SV% = Save percentage; GAA = Goals against average

Awards

NCAA

Atlantic Hockey

Big Ten

ECAC

Hockey East

NCHC

WCHA

Coaching changes
This table lists programs that changed head coaches at any point from the first day of the 2018–19 season until the day before the first day of the 2019–2020 season.

See also
 2018–19 NCAA Division II men's ice hockey season
 2018–19 NCAA Division III men's ice hockey season

References

 
NCAA ice hockey